Rubus lasiococcus is a species of wild blackberry known by the common names roughfruit berry and dwarf bramble. It is native to western North America from British Columbia to northern California, where it grows in mountain forests. In the southern half of its range the plant is commonly found in a plant community in the understory of mountain hemlock (Tsuga mertensiana) and Shasta red fir (Abies magnifica var. shastensis).

Rubus lasiococcus is a tangling, prostrate shrub with very slender stolons spreading along the ground and rooting where their nodes come in contact with moist substrate, forming a mat. Some stems grow erect to bear flowers. The leaves are each deeply divided into three lobes, or compound into three toothed leaflets, borne on a petiole a few centimeters long. The inflorescence is a solitary flower or a pair of flowers with five reflexed sepals and five white petals each just under a centimeter (0.4 inch) long. The fruit is a densely hairy red aggregate less than a centimeter (<0.4 inch) wide.

References

External links
 
 
 
 
Jepson Manual Treatment
University of Washington, Seattle, Burke Museum

lasiococcus
Flora of British Columbia
Flora of the West Coast of the United States
Plants described in 1882
Flora without expected TNC conservation status